Rusumo Bridge is an international bridge across the Kagera River linking Rwanda and Tanzania.

History
Designed by Luigi Corradi and assembled previously in Turin, Italy. The structure was the first road bridge across the Kagera River in Rusumo area.
The bridge is an arch bridge whose construction commenced in 1966.

On 28 April 1994, during the Rwandan genocide, more than 200,000 people crossed the bridge at Rusumo Falls into Tanzania within 24 hours in what  field workers described as "the largest and fastest refugee exodus in modern times".

Given the restrictions on the axle load and the use of only a single lane at a time, a new bridge, the Rusumo International Bridge, adjacent to the single lane bridge, was opened in 2014 to cope with expected increase of the traffic volume between Rwanda and Tanzania in the coming years.

References

Bridges over the Kagera River
Rwanda–Tanzania bridges
Bridges in Rwanda
Bridges in Tanzania
Rwanda–Tanzania border